Katrina Stratton (born 6 January 1973) is a member of the Western Australian Legislative Assembly for the electoral district of Nedlands for the Australian Labor Party. She won her seat at the 2021 Western Australian state election.

Education and Career 
Dr. Stratton has a number of degrees, having obtained a Bachelor of Social Work, a Doctor of Philosophy, and a Master in Business Administration from the University of Western Australia. Prior to her election win in 2021 Startton lectured at Curtin University and was a board member at Tuart Place, a resource service for adults who were in out-of-home care during their childhood.

Election Results

2021 State Election 
The Nedlands seat had been held by the Liberals or their predecessors since its creation in 1930, most notably by former premiers Charles and Richard Court. As a measure of how strongly the seat tilted toward the Liberals, in 2001 Labor was pushed into third place even as the Liberals suffered the second-largest defeat of a sitting government in the state's history at the time. The incumbent member, former minister and former deputy opposition leader Bill Marmion, sat on a margin of eight percent after a redistribution before the writs were issued. However, Stratton narrowly led Marmion on the first count after Marmion lost over 16 percent of his primary vote from 2017. Stratton ultimately won the seat with 52.8% of the two-party preferred vote, a swing of 10.8%, after preferences were distributed. She defeated Marmion on the fifth count after over three-quarters of Green preferences flowed to her. Her victory was part of a large swing toward Labor in west Perth, an area long considered Liberal heartland.

References 

Living people
1973 births 
Australian Labor Party members of the Parliament of Western Australia
Members of the Western Australian Legislative Assembly
Women members of the Western Australian Legislative Assembly
21st-century Australian politicians
Academic staff of Curtin University
21st-century Australian women politicians